Mangle Island (Isla Mangle) is a coral island located in the Archipelago of San Bernardo, Gulf of Morrosquillo, Caribbean Sea. It is governed by Colombia, and is a part of the Colombian Bolívar Department.

See also
 Caribbean region of Colombia
 Insular region of Colombia
 List of islands of South America

References

Further reading
 Lescano, José Zárate (1965). Historia militar del conflicto con Colombia de 1932. Ministerio de Guerra. p. 45. 
 Proceedings of the Gulf and Caribbean Fisheries Institute. Gulf and Caribbean Fisheries Institute. Volume 58. 2007. p. 394.

Caribbean islands of Colombia